Antoine Camilleri may refer to:

 Antoine Camilleri (artist) (1922–2005), Maltese artist and art teacher
 Antoine Camilleri (prelate) (born 1965), Maltese official of the Vatican